Alexandre Gaumont Casias (born 26 November 1984) is a former Canadian male volleyball player. He was a member of the Canada men's national volleyball team, and spent most of his career in the French Pro A.

References

1984 births
Living people
Canadian men's volleyball players
Canadian expatriates in France
Expatriate volleyball players in France
People from Montérégie
Sportspeople from Quebec